Paróquia São Paulo Apóstolo is a church located in São Paulo, Brazil. It was established on 8 December 1939.

References

Churches in São Paulo
Roman Catholic churches completed in 1939
20th-century Roman Catholic church buildings in Brazil